Wayne Krantz is an American guitarist and composer. He has performed and recorded with Steely Dan, Michael Brecker, Donald Fagen, Billy Cobham, Chris Potter, David Binney, and Carla Bley. Since the early 1990s, Krantz has focused primarily on his solo career, mostly as the leader of a trio with Tim Lefebvre and Keith Carlock.

Career
A native of Corvallis, Oregon, Krantz was inspired to play guitar when he was fourteen after hearing the Beatles. Although he played in country and rock bands, he heard jazz through his father's album collection. He was in a band that included Bill Frisell and went on tour with Carla Bley. He released his debut solo album, Signals, in 1991. He formed a trio with Lincoln Goines and Zach Danziger, then with Tim Lefebvre and Keith Carlock. He has also worked with Billy Cobham, Michael Brecker, Chris Potter, and Steely Dan.

Krantz signed with record label Abstract Logix to release his first studio record in over fifteen years: Krantz Carlock Lefebvre (2009) which was recorded in a trio with Lefebvre and Carlock. In 2012, Krantz released Howie 61 (a reference to Bob Dylan's Highway 61 Revisited), which includes John Patitucci, Charley Drayton, Tal Wilkenfeld, Vinnie Colaiuta, Anton Fig, Jeremy Stacey, Paul Stacey, Pino Palladino, Gabriela Anders, Kenny Wollesen, Nate Wood, Henry Hey, and Owen Biddle.

Discography

As leader
 Signals (Enja, 1990)
 Long to Be Loose (Enja, 1993) 
 2 Drink Minimum (Enja, 1995) 
 Krantz Carlock Lefebvre (Abstract Logix, 2009)
 Howie 61 (Abstract Logix, 2012)
 Good Piranha / Bad Piranha (Abstract Logix, 2014)
 Write out your head (Abstract Logix, 2020)
 Music Room 1985 (Abstract Logix, 2021)

As sideman
With David Binney
 Balance (ACT, 2002)
 Aliso (Criss Cross, 2010)
 Graylen Epicenter (Mythology, 2011)
 Anacapa (Criss Cross, 2014)

With Leni Stern
 Secrets (Enja, 1989)
 Closer to the Light (Enja, 1990)
 Ten Songs (Lipstick, 1992)
 Separate Cages (Alchemy, 1996)

With others
 Robby Ameen, Days in the Life (Two and Four, 2009)
 Gabriela Anders, Cool Again (Evj! 2015)
 Jay Anderson, Next Exit (DMP, 1992)
 Fahir Atakoglu, Istanbul in Blue (Far & Here, 2007)
 Fahir Atakoglu, Faces & Places (Far & Here, 2009)
 Victor Bailey, Bottom's Up (Atlantic, 1989)
 Victor Bailey, Low Blow  (ESC, 1999)
 Ranjit Barot, Bada Boom (EMI, 2010)
 John Escreet, The Age We Live in (Mythology, 2011)
 Donald Fagen, Morph the Cat (Reprise, 2006)
 Michael Formanek, Wide Open Spaces (Enja, 1990)
 Michael Formanek, Extended Animation (Enja, 1992)
 Gary Husband, Dirty & Beautiful Vol. 2 (Abstract Logix, 2012)
 Chris Potter, Underground (Universal/Emarcy, 2006)
 Markus Reuter, Mundo Nuevo (Unsung, 2015)
 Steps Ahead, Yin-Yang (NYC, 1992)
 Jasper van 't Hof, Blau (ACT, 1992)
 Jasper van 't Hof, Blue Corner (ACT, 1996)
 Steely Dan, Bristow, Va 1996 (Art Crimes Tour Broadcast Recording, 1996)

Further reading
 Gagne, Brian. "Your Basic Mindf***." Meniscus Magazine, August 1, 2003.

References

External links
Official Website
Official Download Website

20th-century American guitarists
21st-century American guitarists
American jazz guitarists
Berklee College of Music alumni
Musicians from Corvallis, Oregon
1967 births
Living people
Guitarists from Oregon